Jolán Simon (31 May 1885, Újpest – 24 September 1938, Budapest) was a Hungarian actor active in the Hungarian avant-garde during the early 20th century.

Her father died when she was still a child, so she was obliged to start work at an early age. She was largely self-taught but she did attend Kálmán Rózsahegyi's drama school.

References

1885 births
1938 deaths
1938 suicides
20th-century Hungarian actresses
People from Újpest
Suicides in Hungary